Lu Yen (20 November 1930 – 1 October 2008) was a Chinese-born Taiwanese composer.

Yen was born in Nanjing, China, and was educated in National Taiwan Normal University, Mannes College, City University of New York, and University of Pennsylvania. He received Taiwan's  in 1993 and 1998. As a pupil of William Jay Sydeman, Mario Davidovsky, George Rochberg and George Crumb, Lu was well known of his atonal writings combining counterpoint skills. George Rochberg commented that Lu's music "has a unique scent". Lu wrote in his article "My Artistic Journey" that he wished to write "music praising mother nature's great beauty and powers."  During 1967–2008, Lu wrote 6 solo instrumental works, 70+ chamber ensemble works (excluding art songs), 5 Chinese chamber works, 16 orchestral works, 1 Chinese orchestra piece, and 11 art songs. Among these works, there was a repeated theme about the sound of bell, which Lu always remembered from his childhood in the Jiangnan region of China. Two biographies were published in Taiwan, Lu Yen: A Cold Fire of Music, written by Taiwanese poet Chen Li (陳黎) in 1997 and A Poetic Journey of Nostalgia, by Canadian-Taiwanese composer Shyh-ji Chew and Taiwanese composer Janet Jieru Chen in 2004, both published by Taiwan's China Times Publishing Co. Digitalization data of Lu's art song manuscripts and analytic entries are available at Nation Music Archive and Taiwan Music Center of the National Center for Traditional Arts, Taipei, Taiwan.

Lu died in Taipei, Taiwan. Soochow University (Taipei, Taiwan), where he taught music composition and counterpoint for 30 years, has a memorial room and a growing collection of Lu's manuscripts. Lu's music could be heard in albums published by Music Forum, International Society for Contemporary Music-Taiwan Section, Asian Composers League – Taiwanese Composers Association and National Taiwan Symphony Orchestra.

Works
(title; instrumentation; year & place written)

Solo works

; Piano Solo; 1979, Philadelphia
Journey for 21-string Guzheng; Guzheng Solo; 1988, Lo-ye Street, Taipei
Solo Piece for Flute: Thoughts; Flute Solo; 1995, Hsin-dian, Taipei
Solo Piece for Cello: Song; Cello; 1997, Hsin-dian, Taipei
Piano Preludes: Romance, Bell; Piano; 1999, Dong-hu, Taipei
Impromptu for Piano; Piano; 2005, Dong-hu, Taipei

Chamber works

2 players (also refer to Art songs)

Sonata for Violin and Piano; Violin and Piano; 1971, New York
Oboe and Percussion; Oboe, Percussion; 1979, Philadelphia
; Flute, Piano; 1981–1982, Soochow University, Taipei
Percussion and Double Bass; 3 Percussionists and Double Bass; 1985, Lo-ye Street, Taipei
Piece for Piano Four-Hand; Piano Four-hand; 1987, Fremont, CA, USA
Inner Feelings; Baritone and Percussion; 1995, Hsin-dian, Taipei

3 players

Percussion Trio; 3 Percussionists; 1999, Dong-hu, Taipei

4 players

Quartet 1968; Flute, Piano, Bass Trombone or Tuba, Percussion; 1968, New York
Quartet 1970; Clarinet, Tuba and 2 Percussionists; 1970, New York
Quartet 1985 (Two Movements); Clarinet, Violin and Piano Duet; 1985, Lo-ye Street, Taipei
String Quartet: A Flower on a Rainy Night; String Quartet; 1987, Lo-ye Street, Taipei
String Quartet 2006; 2 Violins, Viola, Cello;2006, Dong-hu, Taipei

5 and more players

Septet; Flute, Clarinet, Trumpet, Horn, Cello and 2 Percussionists; 1967, New York
Long Tao Sha (Poem by Li Hou-chu); Flute, Clarinet, Violin, Cello, Percussion, Voice; 1972–1973, New York
Bamboo and Strings; Bamboo Flute, 2 Erhus, Zhonghu, Daruan and Percussion; 1979, Soochow University, Taipei
Quintet for Chinese Instruments I; Di, Pipa, Yangchin, Zhonghu and Sheng; 1983, Soochow University, Taipei
Music for Fifteen Strings; Violin I, Violin II, Viola, Cello, Double Bass, each in three parts; 1988, Roosevelt Road, Taipei
Quintet for Chinese Instruments II; Di, Erhu, Pipa, Gu-zheng and Percussion; 1991, Tian-mu, Taipei
Four Luofu Songs (Chamber Ensemble Version); Mezzo Soprano and Chamber Ensemble; 1995, Hsin-dian, Taipei
Tower in the Woods (Chamber Ensemble Version); Soprano and Chamber Ensemble; 1995, Hsin-dian, Taipei
Woodwind Quintet; Flute, Oboe, Clarinet, Bassoon, Horn; 1996, Hsin-dian, Taipei
Quintet for Chinese Instruments: Voyage of a Rainy Port; Di, Erhu, Pipa, Yang-chin and Gu-zheng; 1997, Hsin-dian, Taipei
Moon (Poem by Hong-hsuan Dai); Flute, Clarinet, Clarinet, Violin, Double Bass, Percussion and Soprano; 1998, Dong-hu, Taipei
Quintet for Music Forum; 2 Percussionists, Piano, 2 Flutists (Alto and Soprano); 1998, Dong-hu, Taipei
Imitation of Traditional Songs: Tzueifuguei and Tzaoluopao from Qunqu Opera The Peony Pavilion; Soprano and Chamber Ensemble; 1998, Dong-hu, Taipei
The Use of a Large Gourd (from Xiaoyaoyou by Chuang Tzu); Mixed Choir accompanied by Chinese Instruments; 2000, Dong-hu, Taipei
Octet; Flute, Oboe, Trumpet, Trombone, Violin, Viola, Cello, Double Bass; 2003, Dong-hu, Taipei
Sextet for Chinese Instruments;
Music Forum Concerto for Two Pianos and Percussion Ensemble; 2 pianos, percussion ensemble; 2006, Dong-hu, Taipei

Orchestral works
Memories of Jiangnan (for Small Orchestra); Small Orchestra; 1978–1979, Philadelphia
Memories of Jiangnan (for Chamber Ensemble); Chamber Orchestra; 1980, Soochow University, Taipei
Memories of Jiangnan I, II, III (for Orchestra); Orchestra; 1982, Soochow University, Taipei
Song of Ying-Ying  (Epiphyllum) (Tin-o-o Variation)for Orchestra; String Orchestra; 1983, Soochow University, Taipei
Three Movements for Orchestra; Orchestra; 1985, Lo-ye Street, Taipei
Fantasy for Orchestra I – Sea Winds and a Singing Voice; Orchestra (triple winds); 1987, Lo-ye Street, Taipei
Fantasy for Orchestra II – Song of Caressing a Sword; Chorus and Orchestra (triple winds); 1988, Roosevelt Road, Taipei
Piano Concerto; Piano Solo and Chamber Ensemble; 1995, Hsin-dian, Taipei
Ode to Centennial of Soochow University; Solo Voices, Chorus and Large Orchestra; 1999, Dong-hu, Taipei
Fantasy for Orchestra III –Chih-si song; Large Orchestra; 2001, Dong-hu, Taipei
Taipei Suite; Large Orchestra; 2002, Dong-hu, Taipei
Taipei Concerto; Flute and String Orchestra; 2003, Dong-hu, Taipei
Da Yue in Three Movements; Chinese Orchestra; 2004, Dong-hu Taipei
Taipei Concerto for Flute and String Orchestra; Flute and String Orchestra; 2003, Dong-hu, Taipei
Piano Concerto; Piano and Orchestra; 2006–2008, Dong-hu, Taipei

Art songs
Long Tao Sha (Poem by Li Hou-chu); Flute, Clarinet, Violin, Cello, Percussion, Voice; 1972–1973, New York
Tower in the Woods (Poem by Hong-hsuan Dai); Soprano and Piano; 1984, Soochow University, Taipei
Four Luofu Songs; Mezzo Soprano and Piano; 1987–1988, Lo-ye Street, Taipei
Beyond Smoke
Four Lines in Qingming
A Bird Flies By
Under the Window;
Four Luofu Songs (Chamber Ensemble Version); Mezzo Soprano and Chamber Ensemble; 1995, Hsin-dian, Taipei
Tower in the Woods  (Chamber Ensemble Version); Soprano and Chamber Ensemble; 1995, Hsin-dian, Taipei
Inner Feelings;Baritone and Percussion;1995, Hsin-dian, Taipei
; Soprano and Piano; 1998, Dong-hu, Taipei
Imitation of Traditional Songs:Tzueifuguei and Tzaoluopao from Qunqu Opera The Peony Pavilion; Soprano and Chamber Ensemble; 1998, Dong-hu, Taipei
Moon (Poem by Hong-hsuan Dai); Flute, Clarinet, Clarinet, Violin, Double Bass, Percussion and Soprano; 1998, Dong-hu, Taipei
Two Songs of Time: Issa, Postcard for Messiaen  (Poems by Chen Li);Soprano and Piano; 1999, Dong-hu, Taipei
Ode to Centennial of Soochow University ; Solo Voices, Chorus and Large Orchestra; 1999, Dong-hu, Taipei
Love Song to Twin-Brook (Poem by Chien-Lung Lin);Solo Voice (doubled with clarinet, flute, violin or viola) and Piano;1999, Dong-hu, Taipei
The Use of a Large Gourd (from Xiaoyaoyou by Chuang Tzu);Mixed Choir accompanied by Chinese Instruments; 2001, Dong-hu, Taipei
The Clown God (Poem by Chien-hua Chen);Voice accompanied by cello; 2003, Dong-hu, Taipei

Biographical chronology

Early life in China and Taiwan

1930(0y)
Yen Lu was born in Nanjing, China on November 20. His parents were Gan Lu, and Bi-cheng Wang.
1937(7y)
When Sino-Japanese War began, the Lu's fled to Jiangxi and Sichuan. Yen grew up in Sichuan, where he entered the Christian Shengguang Elementary and Junior High Schools till he was 15 years old.
1945(15y)
Sino-Japanese War ended and Yen returned to Nanjing. He graduated from junior high school and then entered Soochow's Shengguang Senior High School.
1946(16y)
Education was suspended due to Malignant Malaria and Gastric ulcer.
1947(17y)
Applied Nanjing Conservatory of Music in summer but was rejected. He returned to Shengguang Senior High School and started from the first year.
1948(18y)
Applied Nanjing Conservatory of Music for the second time, and failed again.
1949(19y)
Visited Taiwan for the first time in life, but returned to Shanghai shortly and then went to Taiwan again.
Entered National Taiwan Normal University Department of Music
1953(23y)
Finished all courses of college, and started a one-year internship in Taoyuan School of Agriculture.
1954(24y)
Graduated from NTNU with Bachelor of Arts. Started one-year military service.
1955(25y)
Studied harmony and counterpoint with composer Er-hua Hsiao(蕭而化) while teaching in Taipei Municipal Jianguo High School’s night division.
1958(28y)
Taught harmony and counterpoint in Taiwan’s National Arts School (today’s National Taiwan University of Arts) till 1962.

Exploration (U.S. Era)

1963(33y)
Traveled on a cargo ship in summer to the U.S for further studies. Entered Northeast Missouri State University for Master of Music Education program.
1965(35y)
Gave up master’s degree and entered New York’s Mannes College of Music, started from undergraduate program, where he majored in music composition, studying with William Sydeman
1966(36y)
Hospitalized due to Gastrorrhagia, received stomach surgery in Columbia University Hospital.
1967(37y)
Presented his first music composition, Septet for flute, clarinet, trumpet, horn, cello and two percussion parts.
1971(41y)
Graduated from Mannes College of Miusic.
1972(42y)
Entered City College of New York to study music composition and electronic music with Mario Davidovsky, at the same time worked in Seesaw Music Corp.
Started writing song Long Tao Sha with lyrics by an American poet, which was re-written in 1976 with Lee Houchu (李後主)’s poem. This is the first work in Lu’s Ancient Chanting Series.
1976(46y)
Invited by colleague composer  to teach in Taiwan's Soochow University's Music Department as a visiting professor for one year.
1977(47y)
Entered University of Pennsylvania graduate program, studying with George Rochberg and George Crumb.
1979(49y)
Received a master's degree from U.Penn. In the same year, he returned to Taiwan and taught at Soochow University Music Department as a lecturer.

Reflection and heart-searching

1988(58y)
Received Taiwan's Golden Tripod Awards with the publication of his Piano Four-Hand, recorded by Lina Yeh and Rolf-Peter Wille.
1993(63y)
Received Taiwan's Miniarey of Education's 18th National Award for Arts of Taiwan with his Fantasy for Orchestra I – Sea Winds and a Singing Voice.
1994(64y)
Presented works at Taipei Theater in New York on September 4 with fellow Taiwanese composers.
1995(65y)
 Beyond the Smoke/A Bird Flies By-Lu Yen’s Musical World, a concert featuring Yen Lu's music, was held in Taiwan's National Concert Hall on October 26, presented by Contemporary Chamber Orchestra Taipei, conducted by Chun-Fung Lee().
1996(66y)
Retired from Soochow University and continued to teach as an associate professor.

Maturity and freedom

1998(68y)
Received Taiwan's Second National Arts and Cultural Medal.
1999(69y)
In Forum of Lu Yen’s Music on June 6 at Music Forum Musique Theatre, his Septet, Long Tao Sha, Duet for Flute and Piano, Moon, A Postcard for Messiaen, and Piano Prelude were performed.
2000(70y)
Concert Parnassus from Lu Yen featuring Yen’s 10 art songs was held to celebrate his 70th birthday on January 5, performed by Contemporary Chamber Orchestra Taipei, conducted by Chun-Fung Lee.
2002(72y)
Received the honor of Chair Professor of Soochow University.
2003(73y)
Received TECO Award’s Music Composition Medal.
Song Album of Yen Lu, which contains Four Luofu Songs, Tower in the Woods, and Furniture Music, was published in March, sponsored by Department of Cultural Affairs of Taipei.
Tower in the Woods were performed and discussed in Contemporary Music Forum of Yen Lu’s Music at Music Forum Musique Theatre.
2004(74y)
Presented My Artistic Journey in Ethno Music Composition Forum in March.
2005(75y)
Yen Lu 75 th Birthday Concert was held on November 20th at Music Forum's Recital Hall, in which Four Preludes for Piano (1979), Piano Four-Hand (1987), Two Preludes for Piano (1999), Impromptu for Piano (2005), and Song for Cello (1997) were presented along with students’ music compositions as gifts. Pianists Daming Zhu (諸大明), Lina Yeh, Rolf-Peter Wille, Mei-Ya Lo Hsin-Jung Hsieh, and cellist Hsien-Liang Lien joined this concert.
2007(77y)
Married for the first time in life, with Ms. Ya-shih (a.k.a. Alice, Su-Chih, Shih-Ya) Cherng.
Diagnosed with oral cancer by the end of 2007.
2008(78y)
Died of oral cancer on October 1.

References

20th-century classical composers
21st-century classical composers
Taiwanese classical composers
National Taiwan University alumni
Mannes School of Music alumni
City College of New York alumni
University of Pennsylvania alumni
1930 births
2008 deaths
Musicians from Nanjing
Male classical composers
20th-century male musicians
21st-century male musicians